Corchorus is a genus of about 40–100 species of flowering plants in the family Malvaceae, native to tropical and subtropical regions throughout the world.

Different common names are used in different contexts, with jute applying to the fiber produced from the plant, and jute mallow leaves for the leaves used as a vegetable.

Description
The plants are tall, usually annual herbs, reaching a height of 2–4 m, unbranched or with only a few side branches. The leaves are alternate, simple, lanceolate, 5–15 cm long, with an acuminate tip and a finely serrated or lobed margin. The flowers are small (2–3 cm diameter) and yellow, with five petals; the fruit is a many-seeded capsule.

Taxonomy
The genus Corchorus is classified under the subfamily Grewioideae of the family Malvaceae. It contains around 40 to 100 species.

The genus Oceanopapaver, previously of uncertain placement, has recently been synonymized under Corchorus. The name was established by André Guillaumin in 1932 for the single species Oceanopapaver neocaledonicum Guillaumin from New Caledonia. The genus has been classified in a number of different families including Capparaceae, Cistaceae, Papaveraceae, and Tiliaceae. The putative family name "Oceanopapaveraceae" has occasionally appeared in print and on the web but is a nomen nudum and has never been validly published nor recognised by any system of plant taxonomy.

The genus Corchorus was first described by Linnaeus in his great work Species Plantarum (1753).

Species
Species in the genus include:

 Corchorus aestuans L.
 Corchorus africanus Bari
 Corchorus angolensis Exell & Mendonça
 Corchorus aquaticus Rusby
 Corchorus argillicola Moeaha & P.J.D.Winter
 Corchorus asplenifmô0olius Burch.
 Corchorus aulacocarpus Halford
 Corchorus baldaccii Mattei
 Corchorus brevicornutus Vollesen
 Corchorus capsularis L.
 Corchorus carnarvonensis Halford
 Corchorus chrozophorifolius (Baill.) Burret
 Corchorus cinerascens Deflers
 Corchorus confusus Wild
 Corchorus congener Halford
 Corchorus cunninghamii F.Muell.
 Corchorus deccanensis H.B.Singh & M.V.Viswan.
 Corchorus depressus (L.) Peterm.
 Corchorus elachocarpus F.Muell.
 Corchorus elderi F.Muell.
 Corchorus erodioides Balf.f.
 Corchorus fascicularis Lam.
 Corchorus foliosus Spreng.
 Corchorus gillettii Bari
 Corchorus hamatus Baker
 Corchorus hirsutus L.
 Corchorus hirtus L.
 Corchorus hygrophilus A.Cunn. ex Benth.
 Corchorus incanus Halford
 Corchorus junodii (Schinz) N.E.Br.
 Corchorus kirkii N.E.Br.
 Corchorus laniflorus Rye
 Corchorus lasiocarpus Halford
 Corchorus leptocarpus A.Cunn. ex Benth.
 Corchorus longipedunculatus Mast.
 Corchorus macropetalus (F.Muell.) Domin
 Corchorus macropterus G.J.Leach & Cheek
 Corchorus merxmuelleri Wild
 Corchorus mitchellensis Halford
 Corchorus neocaledonicus Schltr.
 Corchorus obclavatus Halford
 Corchorus olitorius L.
 Corchorus orinocensis Kunth
 Corchorus parviflorus (Benth.) Domin
 Corchorus parvifolius Sebsebe
 Corchorus pascuorum Domin
 Corchorus pinnatipartitus Wild
 Corchorus psammophilus Codd
 Corchorus pseudo-olitorius Islam & Zaid
 Corchorus pseudocapsularis Schweinf.
 Corchorus puberulus Halford
 Corchorus pumilio R.Br. ex Benth.
 Corchorus reynoldsiae Halford
 Corchorus saxatilis Wild
 Corchorus schimperi Cufod.
 Corchorus sericeus Ewart & O.B.Davies
 Corchorus siamensis Craib
 Corchorus sidoides F.Muell.
 Corchorus siliquosus L.
 Corchorus subargentus Halford
 Corchorus sublatus Halford
 Corchorus sulcatus I.Verd.
 Corchorus tectus Halford
 Corchorus thozetii Halford
 Corchorus tiniannensis Hosok.
 Corchorus tirunelveliensis Kalaiselvan, Selvak. & Rajakumar
 Corchorus tomentellus F.Muell.
 Corchorus torresianus Gaudich.
 Corchorus tridens L.
 Corchorus trilocularis L.
 Corchorus urticifolius Wight & Arn.
 Corchorus velutinus Wild
 Corchorus walcottii F.Muell.

Uses

Fiber

The fibers from Corchorus (known as jute) are the most widely cultivated vegetable fiber after cotton.

Food

Corchorus leaves are consumed in the cuisines of various countries. Corchorus olitorius is used mainly in the cuisines of southern Asia, the Middle East, North Africa and West Africa, Corchorus capsularis in Japan and China.  It has a mucilaginous (somewhat "slimy") texture, similar to okra, when cooked. The seeds are used as a flavouring, and a herbal tea is made from the dried leaves. The leaves of Corchorus are rich in betacarotene, iron, calcium, and vitamin C. The plant has an antioxidant activity with a significant α-tocopherol equivalent vitamin E.

In North Africa and the Middle East, the young leaves of Corchorus species are known in Arabic as malukhiyah and are used as green leafy vegetables . Malukhiyah is eaten widely in Egypt and some consider it the Egyptian national dish. It is featured in cuisines from Lebanon, Palestine, Syria, Jordan and Tunisia. In Turkey and Cyprus, the plant is known as molohiya or molocha and is usually cooked into a kind of chicken stew. The leaves of Corchorus have been a staple Egyptian food since the time of the Pharaohs and it is from there that it gains its recognition and popularity. Varieties of mallow-leaves stew with rice is a well known Middle Eastern cuisine.

In Nigerian cuisine, it is used in a stew known as ewedu, a condiment to other starch-based foods such as amala or added with gbegiri a local Nigerian soup. In Northern Nigeria it is known as Ayoyo. They use it to cook a sauce called (Miyan Ayoyo) which is commonly served with Tuwon Masara or Tuwon Allebo.

In Ghana, it is mostly eaten by the people in the North and it is called ayoyo. It is mostly eaten with Tuo Zaafi (food prepared with cornflour).

In Sierra Leone it is known as krain krain (or crain crain) and is cooked as stew. The stew is usually eaten with rice or foofoo (a traditional food made from cassava).

Jute leaves are also consumed among the Luhya people of Western Kenya, where it is commonly known as mrenda or murere. It is eaten with starchy foods like ugali, a staple for most communities in Kenya. In Northern Sudan it is called khudra, meaning "green" in Sudanese Arabic. The Songhai people of Mali call it fakohoy.

In India, it is locally known as nalta sag. It is a favorite food during the summer months, especially in Sambalpur and the western part of Odisha. Usually it is lightly sauteed  and eaten along with rice or rice gruel.

In the Philippines, C. olitorius is known as saluyot. It is commonly consumed as a leafy vegetable together with bamboo shoots.

In Thai cuisine, the leaves of the Corchorus olitorius (locally known as bai po) are eaten blanched, together with plain rice congee. The taste resembles that of spinach and samphire.

See also

Jute
Malva
Hibiscus
Althaea

References

External links

Malvaceae.info: Corchorus webpage

 
Asian vegetables
.
Fiber plants
Leaf vegetables
Edible plants
Yoruba cuisine
Malvaceae genera